Mihail-Octavian Paul (born May 12, 1982) is a Romanian professional basketball player, currently with CSA Steaua București of the Romanian Liga Națională and the FIBA Europe Cup.

He represented Romania's national basketball team at the EuroBasket 2015 qualification, where he was his team’s best free throw shooter.

References

External links
 Profile at CSA Steaua București's website
 FIBA profile
 Eurobasket.com profile

1982 births
Living people
Sportspeople from Ploiești
Point guards
Romanian men's basketball players